Gunder Bengtsson (2 February 1946 – 2 August 2019) was a Swedish football coach.

Career
Bengtsson started his career as assistant coach under Sven-Göran Eriksson at IFK Göteborg. In 1982, after Eriksson won the UEFA Cup 1981–82 and left the club for Benfica, Bengtsson became head coach for a few months. After that he went to Norwegian club Vålerenga, with which he became champion in 1983 and 1984.

After a short time at Portuguese club Madeira, where he was fired after a few months, and a short return at Vålerenga, he became head coach of IFK Göteborg from 1985 to 1987. In his last year, Göteborg again won the UEFA Cup 1986–87. After this Bengtsson left the club for Panathinaikos FC, where he worked for the season 1988–1989.

In December 1989 he was appointed head coach of Feyenoord, next to junior coach Pim Verbeek. Feyenoord had made a bad start of the season and was at the bottom of the charts. The stubborn Bengtsson couldn't make any impression in Rotterdam. He tried to get the team together with fine systems and endless conditional trainings, but failed. That year Feyenoord finished 11th. In his second season at Feyenoord, the results again were disappointing. In March 1991 he, and second coach Verbeek, were fired, and replaced by Wim Jansen.

After his stay with Feyenoord, Bengtsson in 1992 became manager for Örgryte IS. In 1996, he became coach for PAOK Saloniki and Apollon Limassol, for short terms.

In 2001 Bengtsson became coach of the Norwegian Molde. At his appointment he told the press Molde would become the biggest club in Norway in 2005. In May 2003 he was fired after a bad start of the season. When he left the club, he said that he felt there was not enough progression in the club. After this he retired from professional football.

Honours
Vålerenga
 1. divisjon: 1983, 1984

IFK Göteborg
 Swedish Champion: 1987
 Allsvenskan: 1987
 UEFA Cup: 1986–87

Panathinaikos
 Greek Cup: 1987–88, 1988–89

Footnotes

See also
List of UEFA Cup and Europa League winning managers

References

1946 births
2019 deaths
Swedish football managers
People from Torsby Municipality
UEFA Cup winning managers
Apollon Limassol FC managers
Feyenoord managers
IFK Göteborg managers
Panathinaikos F.C. managers
PAOK FC managers
Vålerenga Fotball managers
Molde FK managers
Swedish expatriate sportspeople in the Netherlands
Swedish expatriate sportspeople in Greece
Swedish expatriate sportspeople in Cyprus
Swedish expatriate football managers
Swedish expatriate sportspeople in Norway
Expatriate football managers in Norway
Expatriate football managers in Cyprus
Expatriate football managers in Greece
Expatriate football managers in the Netherlands
Sportspeople from Värmland County